George Thornhill may refer to:

George Thornhill (cricketer) d. 1875, English cricketer
George Thornhill (MP) d. 1852, English Member of Parliament